Jelle Sels (born 10 August 1995) is a Dutch tennis player.
Sels competes mainly in the Challenger tour circuit.
He has a career high ATP singles ranking of world No. 127 achieved on 28 November 2022. He also has a career high doubles ranking of world No. 201 achieved on 20 June 2022.

Career
In October 2022, Sels won his maiden ATP Challenger singles title at the 2022 Internationaux de Tennis de Vendée in Mouilleron-le-Captif, France. As a result, he moved more than 30 positions up in the rankings in the top 150 at world No. 141 on 10 October 2022.

Tour titles

Singles

References

External links
 
 

1995 births
Living people
People from Woerden
Dutch male tennis players
21st-century Dutch people